Andrena ziziae, the golden alexanders miner bee, is a species of miner bee in the family Andrenidae. It is found in North America.

References

Further reading

External links

 

ziziae
Articles created by Qbugbot
Insects described in 1891